Roosevelt/Central Avenue (also known as Arts District or Cathedral) is a light rail station on Valley Metro Rail in downtown Phoenix, Arizona, United States. It is the eleventh stop southbound, and is located on Central Avenue north of Roosevelt, in the Arts District.

Ridership

Notable places nearby
 Burton Barr Central Library
 Margaret T. Hance Park on Interstate 10's Papago Freeway Tunnel
 Japanese Friendship Garden  (1125 N. 3d Ave.)
 Trinity Cathedral

References

External links
 Valley Metro map

Valley Metro Rail stations in Phoenix, Arizona
Railway stations in the United States opened in 2008
2008 establishments in Arizona